Shanti Shanti Shanti is a 1998 Kannada language romantic comedy Drama film directed by Srinivas. The film starred Abbas, Madhavan, Prakash Raj, Prema, Avni Vasa, and Satish Shah in leading roles. During production, the film became known for its series of innovative ideas in the Kannada film industry. It became the first film to have a website and a six-track DTS sound. The film, which featured cinematography from P. C. Sriram, released on 20 November 1998. This marks the debut of R Madhavan in Indian cinema, as his previous film was an English film.

After the success of Madhavan's Alaipayuthey, the film was dubbed into the Tamil language as Relax to cash in on his newfound following.

Plot
Two siblings live with their father who refuses to give them money to pursue their goals. They befriend Raju, a poor man, who promises to help them achieve their dreams.

Cast
Nelson Ireland as Raju
Madhavan as Siddhartha
Prema as Suzy
Prakash Raj as Ganga Prasad
Satish Shah as Anantha Murthy
Sumithra as Raju's aunt
Sudha Belawadi as Bank Manager
Avni as Shanthi

Production
The director of the film, T. B. Srinivas, an erstwhile assistant director to Mani Ratnam, collaborated with former state cricketer Sanjay Desai, a distributor and theatre-owner, to produce a film on the youngsters of Bangalore and the idea soon started the film. Srinivas claimed he was inspired by two incidents — the kidnapping of a rich businessman by young thugs from Uttar Pradesh who were attracted by Bangalore's reputation as a fast-growing city with rich men and relaxed cops and the case of four city girls running away for a week with a man who promised to help them fulfill their ambitions — in order to write the story.

The film became the first Kannada film for prominent cinematographer P. C. Sreeram whilst noted composer Sandeep Chowta was the music director. The film was notable for becoming the first Kannada language film to have a website for the film. The move happened on the initiative of the director, T. B. Srinivas, although the practice failed to set a trend in the industry.

Soundtrack
The Music Was Composed By Sandeep Chowta.

Kannada

Tamil
Tamil version had additional song "You Relax Baby" which was composed by Swararaj.

Release and reception
Upon release, the film became a financial failure for the producers. However, after the success of Mani Ratnam's Alaipayuthey (2000) in which this film's supporting actor Madhavan, played the lead role, producers opted to dub the film into Tamil as Relax. The Tamil version featured songs from  Alaipayuthey in Madhavan's scenes. Actress Avni was given the stagename of Harini for the Tamil version, while composer Sandeep became Swaraj. Both lead actors threatened legal action, with Madhavan unhappy that a film in which he portrayed a supporting role would hamper his career in Tamil films, whilst Abbas was unhappy that the promoters were ignoring him. He also threatened action claiming that the producers owed him money.

Critical reception 
Srikanth Srinivasa of Deccan Herald felt the film was a "clean, entertaing [sic]" one. Of the acting performances, he wrote, "Abbas is endearing. Avni is attractive. Prema is pretty and Madhavan is peppy. The casting of Satish Shah is unjustified. Prakash Rai outshines all the artistes with his natural performance as a rustic dhaba owner resembling Laloo Prasad Yadav." While he also commended the cinematography, music and playback singing in the film, he felt the film faltered on dubbing and editing, in that "the second half could have been trimmed".

References

External links
Shanti Shanti Shanti at Jointscene

Films scored by Sandeep Chowta
1998 directorial debut films
Indian thriller films
Indian films based on actual events
Films set in Bangalore
Films shot in Bangalore
1990s Kannada-language films
1998 thriller films
1998 films